Vranje Selo is a village in Vižinada municipality in Istria County, Croatia. As of 2001, its population was 54.

References

Populated places in Istria County